USS Case (DD-285) was a  in service with the United States Navy from 1919 to 1930. She was scrapped in 1931.

Description
The Clemson class was a repeat of the preceding  although more fuel capacity was added. They had a crew of 6 officers and 108 enlisted men.

Performance differed radically between the ships of the class, often due to poor workmanship. The Clemson class was powered by two steam turbines, each driving one propeller shaft, using steam provided by four water-tube boilers.

The ships were armed with four 4-inch (102 mm) guns in single mounts and were fitted with two  1-pounder guns for anti-aircraft defense. In many ships a shortage of 1-pounders caused them to be replaced by 3-inch (76 mm) guns. Their primary weapon, though, was their torpedo battery of a dozen 21 inch (533 mm) torpedo tubes in four triple mounts. They also carried a pair of depth charge rails. A "Y-gun" depth charge thrower was added to many ships.

Construction and career
Case, named for Augustus Case, was launched 21 September 1919 by Bethlehem Shipbuilding Corporation, Squantum, Massachusetts; sponsored by Miss A. R. Case; commissioned 8 December 1919 and reported to Destroyer Division 43, Atlantic Fleet.

Between January and July 1920, Case operated along the east coast, and on winter maneuvers in the Caribbean, during which she obtained tactical data for Naval War College study. From July 1920 through December 1921, she operated in reduced commission with fifty per cent of complement. Beginning in December 1921, Case was permanently assigned to Destroyer Division 25 for a regular schedule of operations designed to keep her operational readiness at its maximum. Along with gunnery and engineering exercises and competitions, she joined the fleet annually in maneuvers and war problems.

From 1924 to 1925, Case was flagship of her division, and With it in April 1926 sailed to the European station, where the flag was shown and good-will created by visits to various British and Mediterranean ports. Returning to the United States a year later, the destroyer resumed operations along the east coast and in the Caribbean. Designated for scrapping in accordance with the London Naval Treaty in 1929, Case was decommissioned at Philadelphia 22 October 1930, and sold as a stripped hulk 17 January 1931.

Notes

References

External links

http://www.navsource.org/archives/05/285.htm

 

Clemson-class destroyers
Ships built in Quincy, Massachusetts
1919 ships